The Ministry of Foreign Affairs of Uzbekistan is a Cabinet-level governmental agency in Uzbekistan in charge of conducting and designing the foreign policy of Uzbekistan.

History and functions
The Ministry of Foreign Affairs of Uzbekistan was officially established on February 25, 1994 according to the decree of the President of Uzbekistan No. 769 and Resolution of the Cabinet of Ministers of Uzbekistan.

The ministry functions as an administrative body of state government and is a part of the Cabinet of Ministers of Uzbekistan, responsible for conducting the foreign policy of Uzbekistan based on the Constitution of Uzbekistan and international laws.

The activities of the ministry are supervised directly by the President of Uzbekistan.

Structure
The ministry is headed by the Minister of Foreign Affairs of Uzbekistan, currently, Baxtiyor Saidov (acting Ministry of Foreign Affairs). His First Deputy is Abdulaziz Kamilov who was the first foreign minister since the establishment of the ministry. Other deputies are Rustam Tukhtabaev, Abdurahim Khodjaev, Anvar Solihbaev, Bahtiyar Islamov.

The ministry is divided into several departments:

Department for Europe 
Department for the USA and Americas 
Department for the United Nations and International Organizations 
Legal Department 
Department for the Middle and the Near East 
Department for the Asia and the Pacific 
Department for the CIS and Russia 
Department for the CIS, CSTO and SCO structures 
State Protocol Department 
Personnel and Educational Institutions Department 
Head Department for Foreign Policy Analysis and Strategy 
Department for Communication, Computer Systems and Internet 
Consular Department 
Finance Department 
Accounts Department 
Press Secretary and Press Service 
Department for Administrative Affairs

List of ministers
Shahlo Mahmudova (1991–1992)
 Ubaydulla Abdurazzoqov (1992–1993)
Sodiq Safoyev (February, 1993 – February, 1994)
Abdulaziz Komilov (February 25, 1994 – March 14, 2003)
Sodiq Safoyev (March 14, 2003 – February 4, 2005)
Elyor Ganiyev (February 4, 2005 – July 12, 2006)
Vladimir Norov (July 12, 2006 – December 28, 2010)
Elyor Ganiyev (December 28, 2010 – January 13, 2012)
Abdulaziz Komilov (January 13, 2012 – April 27, 2022) 
Vladimir Norov (April 27, 2022 – December 30, 2022)
Baxtiyor Saidov (December 30, 2022 – present) – Acting Ministry of Foreign Affairs

See also 
Foreign relations of Uzbekistan
Government of Uzbekistan

References

Foreign relations of Uzbekistan
Uzbekistan
Foreign Affairs
Ministries established in 1994
1994 establishments in Uzbekistan